George Pepperdine (June 20, 1886 – July 31, 1962) was an American entrepreneur and Christian philanthropist who was the founder of Pepperdine University in California.

Biography

Early life
George Pepperdine was born on June 20, 1886, on a farm in Mound Valley, Kansas, to a family of English heritage. His parents became members of The Church of Christ after experiencing a powerful conversion during a tent meeting outside of Parsons, Kansas. Pepperdine graduated from Parsons Business College in Parsons, Kansas.

Career
In 1909, at the age of 23, he started Western Auto Supply Company in Kansas City, Missouri, with an initial investment of five dollars. With the rise in popularity of the automobile, Pepperdine's business thrived, providing high-quality automotive products and services through many retail stores. He moved to California in 1916.

Philanthropy
In February 1937, during the Great Depression, he founded Pepperdine University as a Christian liberal arts college in Los Angeles California. By April 6, 1938, George Pepperdine College was fully accredited by the Northwest Association.

He had a desire to discover "how humanity can be helped most with the means entrusted to [his] care. [He] consider[ed] it wrong to build up a great fortune and use it selfishly." Pepperdine voiced his twofold objective for the college that bore his name, "First, we want to provide first-class, fully accredited academic training in the liberal arts ... Secondly, we are especially dedicated to a greater goal—that of building in the student a Christ-like life, a love for the church, and a passion for the souls of mankind."

Personal life
He married Lena Rose Baker in 1907 in Kansas. She died in 1930, and he remarried in 1934 to Helen Louise Davis.

Death
He died in California in 1962.

References

Bibliography

External links
Pepperdine University.edu: Official biography
Pepperdine Finding Aid to his Papers

1886 births
1962 deaths
People from Labette County, Kansas
People from Los Angeles
Businesspeople from Los Angeles
Philanthropists from California
Founders of schools in the United States
Pepperdine University
University and college founders
American members of the Churches of Christ
American people of English descent
20th-century American businesspeople
20th-century American philanthropists